Thunders may refer to:

 Bonnie Thunders (born 1983), American roller derby skater
 Johnny Thunders (1952–1991), American guitarist, singer, and songwriter
 JT Thunders, a Japanese men's volleyball club

See also
 Thunder (disambiguation)
 Seven Thunders (disambiguation)